Haplogroup R-M269 is the sub-clade of  human Y-chromosome haplogroup R1b that is defined by the SNP marker M269. According to ISOGG 2020 it is phylogenetically classified as R1b1a1b. It underwent intensive research and was previously classified as R1b1a2 (2003 to 2005), R1b1c (2005 to 2008), R1b1b2 (2008 to 2011) and R1b1a1a2 (2011 to 2020).

R-M269 is of particular interest for the genetic history of Western Europe, being the most common European haplogroup. It increases in frequency on an east to west gradient (its prevalence in Poland estimated at 22.7%, compared to Wales at 92.3%). It is carried by approximately 110 million European men (2010 estimate). 
The age of the mutation M269 is estimated at 4,000 to 10,000 years ago.

Origin
R-M269 had formerly been dated to the Upper Paleolithic, but by about 2010 it was thought to have formed near the beginning of the Neolithic Revolution, about 10,000 years ago. More recent archaeogenetics studies since 2015, however, strongly suggest an origin among Eneolithic hunter-gatherers from eastern Europe.

Balaresque et al. (2010) based on the pattern of Y-STR diversity argued for a single source in the Near East and introduction to Europe via Anatolia in the Neolithic Revolution. In this scenario, Mesolithic hunter-gatherers in Europe would have been nearly replaced by the incoming farmers. By contrast, Busby et al. (2012) could not confirm the results of Balaresque et al. (2010) and could not make credible estimates of the age of R-M269 based on Y-STR diversity. Furthermore, more recent studies have found that the Y-DNA of Early European Farmers is typically haplogroup G2a.

According to a 2015 study, a hunter-gatherer from Samara (dated 5640-5555 cal BCE) belonging to haplogroup R1b1(*) was ancestral for both haplogroups R-M269 and R-M478. According to the authors, the occurrence of basal forms of R1b in eastern European hunter-gatherers provides a "geographically plausible source" for haplogroup R-M269. Subclades of R-M269, such as R-Z2103, have been found to be prevalent in ancient DNA found in individuals associated with the Yamnaya culture and related populations, and the dispersal of this haplogroup is associated with the spread of so-called "steppe ancestry" and at least some of the Indo-European languages.

The subclade R-P311  is substantially confined to Western Europe in modern populations. R-P311 is absent from Neolithic-era ancient DNA found in Western Europe, strongly suggesting that its current distribution is due to population movements within Europe taking place after the end of the Neolithic.  The three major subclades of P311 are U106 (S21), L21 (M529, S145), and U152 (S28). These show a clear articulation within Western Europe, with centers in the Low Countries, the British Isles and the Alps, respectively. These lineages are associated with the non-Iberian steppe-related groups of the Bell Beaker culture, and demonstrate the relationship between steppe-related ancestry and R1b-M269 subclades, which are "the major lineage associated with the arrival of Steppe ancestry in western Europe after 2500 BC".

Distribution

European R1b is dominated by R-M269. It has been found at generally low frequencies throughout central Eurasia, but with relatively high frequency among the Bashkirs of the Perm region (84.0%) and Baymaksky District (81.0%). This marker is present in China and India at frequencies of less than one percent. The table below lists in more detail the frequencies of M269 in regions in Asia, Europe, and Africa.

Distribution of R-M269 in Europe increases in frequency from east to west. It peaks at the national level in Wales at a rate of 92%, at 82% in Ireland, 70% in Scotland, 68% in Spain, 60% in France (76% in Normandy), about 60% in Portugal, 50% in Germany, 50% in the Netherlands, 47% in Italy, 45% in Eastern England, 43% in Denmark and 42% in Iceland. It is as high as 95% in parts of Ireland. It is also found in some areas of North Africa, where its frequency peaks at 10% in some parts of Algeria. M269 has likewise been observed among 8% of the Herero in Namibia. The R-M269 subclade has been found in ancient Guanche (Bimbapes) fossils excavated in Punta Azul, El Hierro, Canary Islands, which are dated to the 10th century (~44%). In western Asia, R-M269 has been reported in 29.2% of Assyrian males from Iran. Haplogroup R1b1 and its subclades in Asia. 
M269* (xL23) is found at highest frequency in the central Balkans notably Kosovo with 7.9%, North Macedonia 5.1% and Serbia 4.4%. Kosovo is notable in having a high percentage of descendant L23* or L23(xM412) at 11.4% unlike most other areas with significant percentages of M269* and L23* except for Poland with 2.4% and 9.5% and the Bashkirs of southeast Bashkortostan with 2.4% and 32.2% respectively. Notably this Bashkir population also has a high percentage of M269 sister branch M73 at 23.4%. Five individuals out of 110 tested in the Ararat Valley, Armenia belonged to R1b1a2* and 36 to L23*, with none belonging to known subclades of L23. Trofimova et al. (2015) found a surprising high frequency of R1b-L23 (Z2105/2103) among the peoples of the Idel-Ural. 21 out of 58 (36.2%) of Burzyansky District Bashkirs, 11 out of 52 (21.2%) of Udmurts, 4 out of 50 (8%) of Komi, 4 out of 59 (6.8%) of Mordvins, 2 out of 53 (3.8%) of Besermyan and 1 out of 43 (2.3%) of Chuvash were R1b-L23 (Z2105/2103), the type of R1b found in the recently analyzed Yamna remains of the Samara Oblast and Orenburg Oblast.

Especially Western European R1b is dominated by specific sub-clades of R-M269 (with some small amounts of other types found in areas such as Sardinia). 
Within Europe, R-M269 is dominated by R-M412, also known as R-L51, which according to Myres et al. (2010) is "virtually absent in the Near East, the Caucasus and West Asia." This Western European population is further divided between R-P312/S116 and R-U106/S21, which appear to spread from the western and eastern Rhine river basin respectively. 
Myres et al. note further that concerning its closest relatives, in R-L23*, it is "instructive" that these are often more than 10% of the population in the Caucasus, Turkey, and some southeast European and circum-Uralic populations.

In Western Europe it is present but in generally much lower levels apart from "an instance of 27% in Switzerland's Upper Rhone Valley." 
In addition, the sub-clade distribution map, Figure 1h titled "L11(xU106,S116)", in Myres et al. shows that R-P310/L11* (or as yet undefined subclades of R-P310/L11) occurs only in frequencies greater than 10% in Central England with surrounding areas of England and Wales having lower frequencies. This R-P310/L11* is almost non-existent in the rest of Eurasia and North Africa with the exception of coastal lands fringing the western and southern Baltic (reaching 10% in Eastern Denmark and 6% in northern Poland) and in Eastern Switzerland and surrounds.

In 2009, DNA extracted from the femur bones of 6 skeletons in an early-medieval burial place in Ergolding (Bavaria, Germany) dated to around c. 670 yielded the following results: 4 were found to be haplogroup R1b with the closest matches in modern populations of Germany, Ireland and the USA while 2 were in Haplogroup G2a.

Population studies which test for M269 have become more common in recent years, while in earlier studies men in this haplogroup are only visible in the data by extrapolation of what is likely. The following gives a summary of most of the studies which specifically tested for M269, showing its distribution (as a percentage of total population) in Europe, North Africa, the Middle East and Central Asia as far as China and Nepal.

Sub-clades

R1b1a1a2a (R-L23) 
R-L23* (R1b1a1a2a*) is now most commonly found in Europe, Anatolia, the Caucasus.

R1b1a1a2a1 (R-L51) 

R-L51* (R1b1a1a2a1*) is now concentrated in a geographical cluster centred on southern France and northern Italy.

R1b1a1a2a1a (R-L151) 

R-L151 (L151/PF6542, CTS7650/FGC44/PF6544/S1164, L11, L52/PF6541, P310/PF6546/S129, P311/PF6545/S128) also known as R1b1a1a2a1, and its subclades, include most males with R1b in Western Europe.

R1b1a1a2a1a1 (R-U106) 
This subclade is defined by the presence of the SNP U106, also known as S21 and M405. It  appears to represent over 25% of R1b in Europe.  In terms of percentage of total population, its epicenter is Friesland, where it makes up 44% of the population. In terms of total population numbers, its epicenter is Central Europe, where it comprises 60% of R1 combined. See also Haplogroup R-Z18

While this sub-clade of R1b is frequently discussed amongst genetic genealogists, the following table represents the peer-reviewed findings published so far in the 2007 articles of Myres et al. and Sims et al.

R-P312 
R1b1a1a2a1a2, better known as R-P312 (or R-S116) is one of the most common types of R-M269 in Europe, alongside R-U106. Myres et al. described it as originating in and spreading from the west of the Rhine basin.

R-P312 has been the subject of significant, ongoing study concerning its complex internal structure.

R-DF27

R-M153

R-M153 is a subclade of R-DF27 that has been found mostly in Basques and Gascons, among whom it represents a sizeable fraction of the Y-DNA pool, though is also found occasionally among Iberians in general. The first time it was located (Bosch 2001) it was described as H102 and included seven Basques and one Andalusian.

R-M167

R-M167 is a subclade of R-DF27 defined by the presence of the marker M167. The first author to test for this marker (long before current haplogroup nomenclature existed) was Hurles in 1999, who tested 1158 men in various populations. He found it relatively common among Basques (13/117: 11%) and Catalans (7/32: 22%). Other occurrences were found among other French, British, Spaniards, Béarnais, and Germans.

In 2000 Rosser et al., in a study which tested 3616 men in various populations also tested for that same marker, naming the haplogroup Hg22, and again it was found mainly among Basques (19%), in lower frequencies among French (5%), Bavarians (3%), Spaniards (2%), Southern Portuguese (2%), and in single occurrences among Romanians, Slovenians, Dutch, Belgians and English.::In 2001 Bosch described this marker as H103, in 5 Basques and 5 Catalans. Further regional studies have located it in significant amounts in Asturias, Cantabria and Galicia, as well as again among Basques. Cases in the Azores have been reported. In 2008 two research papers by López-Parra and Adams, respectively, confirmed a strong association with all or most of the Pyrenees and Eastern Iberia.

In a larger study of Portugal in 2006, with 657 men tested, Beleza et al. confirmed similar low levels in all the major regions, from 1.5%–3.5%.

R-L165

This subclade is defined by the presence of the marker S68, also known as L165. It is found in England, Scandinavia, and Scotland (in this country it is mostly found in the Northern Isles and Outer Hebrides). It has been suggested, therefore, that it arrived in the British Isles with Vikings.

R-U152

R-U152 is defined by the presence of the marker U152, also called S28. Its existence was confirmed by Sims et al. (2007). Myres et al. report this clade "is most frequent (20–44%) in Switzerland, Italy, France and Western Poland, with additional instances exceeding 15% in some regions of England and Germany." Similarly Cruciani et al. (2010) reported frequency peaks in Northern and Central Italy and France. Out of a sample of 135 men in Tyrol, Austria, 9 tested positive for U152/S28. Far removed from this apparent core area, Myres et al. also mention a sub-population in north Bashkortostan, where 71% of 70 men tested belong to R-U152. They propose this to be the result of an isolated founder effect. King  et al. (2014) reported four living descendants of Henry Somerset, 5th Duke of Beaufort in the male line tested positive for U-152. Ancient samples from the central European Bell Beaker, Hallstatt and Tumulus cultures belonged to this subclade.  Analized Iron Age Latins and Etruscans dating between 1000 and 100 BCE belonged primarily to haplogroup R1b-U152 (including the clades L2, Z56 and Z193).

R-L21
R-L21 is also known as R-M529 and R-S145. Myres et al. report it is most common in Ireland, Scotland and Wales (25–50% of the whole male population).

R-L159.2 This subclade within R-L21 is defined by the presence of the marker L159 and is known as L159.2 because of a parallel mutation that exists inside haplogroup I2a1 (L159.1).  L159.2 appears to be associated with the Kings of Leinster and Diarmait Mac Murchada; Irish Gaels belonging to the Laigin. It can be found in the coastal areas of the Irish Sea including the Isle of Man and the Hebrides, as well as Norway, western and southern Scotland, northern and southern England, northwest France, and northern Denmark.

R-L193 This subclade within R-L21 is defined by the presence of the marker L193.  Many surnames with this marker are associated geographically with the western "Border Region" of Scotland.  A few other surnames have a Highland association.  R-L193 is a relatively young subclade likely born within the last 2000 years.

R-L226 This subclade within R-L21 is defined by the presence of the marker L226, also known as S168. Commonly referred to as Irish Type III, it is concentrated in central western Ireland and associated with the Dál gCais kindred.

R-DF21 This subclade within R-L21 is defined by the presence of the marker DF21 aka S192. It makes up about 10% of all L21 men and is c.3000 years old.

R-L371 This subclade within R-L21 is defined by the presence of the marker L371, referred to as the Welsh modal and associated with ancient Welsh Kings and Princes.

See also 
Y-DNA haplogroups in populations of Europe
Haplogroup R1a

References 

R1b1a1a2
Neolithic Europe
Genetic history of Europe
Indo-European genetics
R